Garkan-e Jonubi District (meaning "South Garkan District") is a district (bakhsh) in Mobarakeh County, Isfahan Province, Iran. At the 2006 census, its population was 27,791, in 7,325 families.  The District has one city: Zibashahr. The District has two rural districts (dehestan): Garkan Rural District and Nurabad Rural District.

References 

Mobarakeh County
Districts of Isfahan Province